Alphonsus "Rick" Doerr (born November 21, 1960) is a U.S. Paralympic sailor. He won a silver medal at the 2016 Summer Paralympics in the Three-Person Keelboat (Sonar). Rick was formerly a lacrosse player until his career was cut short by a car accident.

References

External links

Campaign website

1960 births
Living people
American male sailors (sport)
Sonar class world champions
Disabled sailing world champions
World champions in sailing for the United States
Paralympic sailors of the United States
Sailors at the 2008 Summer Paralympics
Sailors at the 2016 Summer Paralympics
Medalists at the 2016 Summer Paralympics
Paralympic medalists in sailing
Paralympic silver medalists for the United States